John Michael Criley, MD, FACC, MACP, (born 1931) is Professor Emeritus at the David Geffen School of Medicine at University of California, Los Angeles (UCLA).

Biography
He has made a number of pioneering contributions to the field of cardiology and medical education of the physical examination. He was also instrumental in the development of the Los Angeles County Fire Department's Paramedic program in 1969. 

He is an authority on cardiac hemodynamics, cardiac auscultation, cardiac catheterization, and valvular heart disease. He served for 25 years as Division Chief at Harbor-UCLA Medical Center in Torrance, California. 

In addition, he is also credited with the term mitral valve prolapse, after demonstrating to Dr. Barlow that it was not aneurysm of the mitral leaflet but rather displacement of the leaflet that led to the condition.

References

David Geffen School of Medicine at UCLA faculty
Living people
1931 births
Date of birth missing (living people)